Pachyosa guanyin is a species of beetle in the family Cerambycidae. It was described by Yamasako and Chou in 2014. It is known from Taiwan.

References

Mesosini
Beetles described in 2014